The Ragged Astronauts is a novel by Bob Shaw published in 1986 by Gollancz. It is the first book in the series Land and Overland. It won the BSFA Award for Best Novel.

Plot summary
The Ragged Astronauts is a novel in which interplanetary travel by hot-air balloon is possible between twin planets that share the same atmosphere. The feudal residents of Land have to migrate to the nearby planet of Overland due to overexploitation of resources on their homeworld. The story is told from the perspective of nobleman Toller Maraquine who clashes with a military Prince before and during the chaotic evacuation accelerated by rioting and a global pandemic.

Reception
Dave Langford reviewed The Ragged Astronauts for White Dwarf #81, and stated that "Pi, in this book, equals 3. Therefore the universe isn't ours, the gravitational constant is different, and physicists will kindly pipe down."

Reviews
Review by Chris Morgan (1986) in Fantasy Review, September 1986
Review by Dan Chow (1986) in Locus, #309 October 1986
Review by Don D'Ammassa (1987) in Science Fiction Chronicle, #96 September 1987
Review by Orson Scott Card (1987) in The Magazine of Fantasy & Science Fiction, November 1987
Review by Paul Kincaid (1987) in Foundation, #38 Winter 1986/87

Awards and nominations

References

1986 British novels
1986 science fiction novels
Novels by Bob Shaw
Steampunk novels
Victor Gollancz Ltd books